Governor Carteret may refer to:

Philip Carteret (colonial governor) (1639–1682), 1st Governor of the Colony of New Jersey from 1665 to 1673 and Governor of East New Jersey from 1674 to 1682
Peter Carteret (1641–after 1676), Governor of the British colony of Albemarle from 1670 to 1672